

171001–171100 

|-bgcolor=#f2f2f2
| colspan=4 align=center | 
|}

171101–171200 

|-id=112
| 171112 Sickafoose ||  || J. Lorin (born 1944) and Tanalynne Sickafoose (1945–2006), parents of the discoverer Amanda Sickafoose Gulbis || 
|-id=118
| 171118 Szigetköz ||  || Szigetköz, a beautiful island plain in western Hungary, part of the Little Hungarian Plain || 
|-id=153
| 171153 Allanrahill ||  || Allan Rahill (born 1958), meteorologist at the Canadian Meteorological Centre || 
|-id=171
| 171171 Prior ||  || Richard M. Prior (born 1942), a Professor of Physics who earned a PhD. in Nuclear Physics at the University of Florida || 
|-id=183
| 171183 Haleakala ||  || Haleakala (Hawaiian for the house of the sun), high dormant volcano on the island of Maui || 
|}

171201–171300 

|-id=256
| 171256 Lucieconstant ||  || Lucie Constant (born 1983), goddaughter of French discoverer Bernard Christophe || 
|}

171301–171400 

|-id=381
| 171381 Taipei ||  || Taipei, known officially as Taipei City, is the political, economic and cultural center of Taiwan. || 
|-id=396
| 171396 Miguel ||  || Miguel Lacruz Martín (born 1963), Spanish mathematician at Kent State University || 
|}

171401–171500 

|-id=429
| 171429 Hunstead ||  || Richard W. Hunstead (1943–2020), Australian astronomer || 
|-id=433
| 171433 Prothous ||  || Prothous, from Greek mythology. He is the leader of Magnesia, son of Tenthredon, was one of the suitors of Helen of Troy || 
|-id=448
| 171448 Guchaohao ||  || Gu Chaohao (1926–2012), a Chinese mathematician who has made contributions to both pure and applied mathematics, and member of the Chinese Academy of Sciences || 
|-id=458
| 171458 Pepaprats ||  || Pepa Prats Cruz (1964–2008), deceased wife of the astrophysicist José Luis Ortiz Moreno, uncredited co-discoverer of this minor planet at La Sagra Observatory || 
|-id=465
| 171465 Evamaria || 6847 P-L || Eva Maria Schubart (1919–2008), teacher of languages in the southern U.S || 
|}

171501–171600 

|-id=588
| 171588 Náprstek ||  || Vojta Náprstek (1826–1894), Czech philanthropist and advocate of progressive ideas || 
|}

171601–171700 

|-id=624
| 171624 Nicolemartin ||  || Nicole P. Martin (born 1973) served as a Pluto flyby sequencer for the New Horizons mission to Pluto. || 
|}

171701–171800 

|-bgcolor=#f2f2f2
| colspan=4 align=center | 
|}

171801–171900 

|-bgcolor=#f2f2f2
| colspan=4 align=center | 
|}

171901–172000 

|-bgcolor=#f2f2f2
| colspan=4 align=center | 
|}

References 

171001-172000